Patrick Tabacco (born 23 April 1974) is a French rugby player.

A native of Toulouse, he has played for the US Colomiers (1997–2000), Stade Français Paris (2000–2004), Section Paloise (2004–2006) and Castres Olympique. He was a member of France's 2003 Rugby World Cup squad and won 18 caps from 2001 to 2005.

Honours
 Stade Français
French Rugby Union Championship/Top 14: 2002–03, 2003–04

References

External links
 RWC 2003 bio
 ERC rugby bio

Rugby union players from Toulouse
US Colomiers players
French rugby union players
Rugby union flankers
Stade Français players
1974 births
Living people
France international rugby union players
Section Paloise players
Castres Olympique players